Lazzaro , a masculine name from the Romance languages

Lazzaro  may also refer to:

 Lazzaro (producer), an Armenian record producer
 Lazzaro (album), album by D'erlanger|

See also 

 San Lazzaro (disambiguation)